The 1993–94 NCAA Division II men's ice hockey season began in November 1993 and concluded on March 12 of the following year. This was the 22nd season of second-tier college ice hockey.

Regular season

Standings

Note: the records of teams who were members of Division III conferences during the season can be found here.

1994 NCAA Tournament

Note: * denotes overtime period(s)Note: Mini-games in italics

See also
 1993–94 NCAA Division I men's ice hockey season
 1993–94 NCAA Division III men's ice hockey season

References

External links

 
NCAA